Troian may refer to:
 Sandra Troian (born 1957), American applied physicist
 Troian Bellisario (born 1985), an American actress
 Troian, a village in Vozneseni commune, Leova District, Moldova
 Troian, a village in Râmnicu Vâlcea, Vâlcea County, Romania
 Troian, an obsolete form of Trojan, of or from Troy

See also
Troiano (disambiguation)
Trojan (disambiguation)
Troyan (disambiguation)
Traian (disambiguation)
Trayan (disambiguation)